Pancreatic artery may refer to

 Dorsal pancreatic artery
 Greater pancreatic artery
 Pancreatic branches of splenic artery